Rajen Tarafdar (7 June 1917 – 23 November 1987) was an Indian film director, actor, and screenwriter. He was the recipient of two National Awards and two BFJA Awards.

He graduated from the Government College of Art & Craft in Calcutta in 1940 with a degree in popular arts. He was initially a graphic designer in an advertising agency before devoting himself to cinema. His directorial debut was Antariksha (1957) which also marked the debut of actress Sandhya Roy.

Awards

Filmography

References

External links

\

1917 births
1987 deaths
20th-century Indian male actors
People from British India
Bengali Hindus
Bengali male actors
Bengali writers
Male actors in Bengali cinema
20th-century Indian film directors
Bengali film directors
Indian male screenwriters
Government College of Art & Craft alumni
University of Calcutta alumni
20th-century Indian screenwriters
20th-century Indian male writers
Film directors from Kolkata
Screenwriters from Kolkata